Trepang may refer to:
A marine invertebrate harvested by trepanging, thus:
A common name for species of the holothuroidea (sea cucumber) class of animals
Trepang (SS-412), a World War II submarine sunk in 1967
Trepang (SSN-674), a submarine commissioned from 1970 to 1999

See also
Trepan (disambiguation)